is a Japanese entertainment company that makes children's toys and merchandise. It was created from a merger on March 1, 2006, of two companies: Tomy (founded in 1924 as Tomiyama, changing the name to Tomy in 1963) and long-time rival Takara (founded in 1955). The company has its headquarters in Katsushika, Tokyo.

History and corporate name

Before the merger
The company was named Tomy as an abridgement of Tomiyama, which was the founder's surname.  Starting as a manufacturer, Tomy had the largest product development team in the toy industry and plaudits for its technology.  Nonetheless, by its third generation, president Mikitaro Tomiyama decided to streamline the company to be more competitive with wholesaler Bandai.  Bandai developed its products more quickly, which was more appealing to television properties that required a fast turnaround.  Despite internal and external opposition, Tomiyama was determined to aggressively pursue TV licenses such as Akakage, Giant Robo and Osomatsu-kun.

Tomiyama was shocked when his son told him that Tomy's toys were bad and that he wanted to work for Bandai when he grew up. In response, he created the moderately successful Zettai Muteki Raijin-Oh, then Genki Bakuhatsu Ganbaruger, but the product development team followed these with Nekketsu Saikyō Go-Saurer, which was a catastrophic failure. It became common wisdom within the industry that Tomy couldn't support a multimedia franchise. However, Tomy established a relationship with Shogakukan and created the successful Wedding Peach and Let's & Go.

Tomy learned about the growing popularity of Pokémon through monthly CoroCoro Comic and obtained the commercial rights. Bandai at the time was busy with its big hit, Tamagotchi, and was not interested in Pokémon. Tomy acquired the rights to commercialize a wide range of merchandise, mainly toys, and released the "Monster Collection" of figures next year. The anime became a huge hit, and sales of related products doubled. Tomy, who had been the third largest company in the toy industry since the 1980s, rose to second place in 1997.

In 2001, competitor Takara's hit franchise, Beyblade, and Pokémon's slump saw Takara regaining second place and Tomy falling again to third. However, Beyblade subsequently faltered, which adversely affected Takara's fortunes; Tomy merged with the suffering company and became Takara–Tomy.

After the merger
The company decided to use the name "Tomy" in international subsidiaries, and "Takara-Tomy"  in Japan, because Tomy had built considerable international brand recognition while Takara's products (Microman, Transformers, Battle Beasts, Beyblade, B-Daman etc.) had been sold and branded by other toy companies such as Hasbro. Additionally, the financial cost of rebranding was prohibitive.

In Western media, the Takara–Tomy merger was typically characterised as a 'takeover' of Takara by Tomy, likely because several years of losses had put Takara in a financially weakened state at the time of the merger (although Takara did have significantly higher sales than Tomy). However, the companies' management teams had previously discussed merging, including at times when Takara appeared stronger. Under Japanese corporate law, the move was a merger of both companies on an equal basis.

Post-merger media speculation about the control of brands from the Takara–Tomy merger arose from the new use of a "TOMY" copyright on all packaging, including former Takara brands shipped by Hasbro, but this was merely a consequence of the decision to use only the Tomy name in international subsidiaries. In Japan, Takara-Tomy continues to use both Tomy and Takara as distinct brand names on toy ranges which originated in each separate company, and most new toy ranges or stand-alone products now carry the new Takara–Tomy brand.

Takara purchased a majority stake in Tatsunoko Production in June 2005. The studio then became a full subsidiary of Takara–Tomy following the March 2006 merger until Yomiuri Shimbun Holdings bought majority of Tatsunoko's stake and is now majorly owned by it affiliate company Nippon TV. Tomy UK was founded in 1982 for the sale and distribution of Tomy products in Europe, and it has successfully brought toys such as Zoids, and games like Pop-up Pirate, to the West. Tomy UK's slogan has traditionally been "Trust Tomy". In 2006, Tomy UK launched a website on which consumers can buy online from Tomy's catalogue. In early 2011, Takara-Tomy acquired RC2 Corporation and the RC2 sub-brand Learning Curve, which included The First Years, Lamaze, and Compass.

Products

Takara-Tomy has manufactured a broad range of products based on its own properties which include, from the Tomy side: Tomica, Plarail, Zoids, Idaten Jump, Nohohon Zoku and Tomy branded baby care products, and, from the Takara side: Space Pets, Choro-Q (also known as Penny Racers), Transformers, B-Daman, Koeda-chan (also known as Treena) and Microman. The merged Takara-Tomy also produces and/or sells a wide variety of toy and game brands under license, such as Thomas & Friends, Disney, Astro Boy, Pokémon, Beyblade, Duel Masters, Naruto, The Game of Life (also known as Jinsei Game), Rockman (a.k.a. Mega Man), Wedding Peach, Mermaid Melody Pichi Pichi Pitch, My Hero Academia, Cardcaptor Sakura, Cardcaptor Sakura: Clear Card, Slayers, Revolutionary Girl Utena, Kirarin Revolution, Sugarbunnies and Animal Crossing. Tomy's rights to these licenses vary by region. One of the first examples of product synergy for the merged company was the combining of Takara's Jinsei Game (Game of Life) license and Tomy's Pokémon license to produce a Pokémon Jinsei Game.

Tomy sells many products worldwide, including baby and pre-school toys, baby monitors, mechanical and electronic games, consumer electronics, children's arts and crafts products, and a vast range of toys suited to girls or boys. They make a large selection of Disney, Pokémon and Thomas the Tank Engine merchandise. They also publish video games in Japan (mostly based on Zoids and Naruto anime series), and are responsible for the distribution of some Hasbro products in Japan, such as Play-Doh, Jenga and Monopoly. The company was formerly responsible for distribution of the My Little Pony products in Japan before Bushiroad acquired the distribution rights to them starting with the franchise's Friendship Is Magic line (though the animated television series was owned by Hasbro). Later in 2015, after Bushiroad disowned the distribution rights, Sega Toys reacquired the rights to all generations of the franchise before selling the rights back to Hasbro.

A list of notable products include:

 Armatron
 Atollo – construction toy
 Bakugan: Battle Planet
 B-Daman – marble shooting toys
 Beyblade – metal top fighting game
 Blip (game) – mechanical Pong-type handheld game
 Blythe
 Boggle Flash
 Choro-Q – micro toy cars
 Chuggington
 Compass
 Crossbows and Catapults
 Duel Masters trading card game franchise
 Eldran series
 Flip Flap – solar-powered plant
 Furby
 Gashapon – vending machines
 Guitar Rockstar
 i-SOBOT
 Jenga
 Jenny
 Katekyo Hitman Reborn! Flame Rumble – a series of fighting games based on the manga/anime for the Nintendo DS
 Kamiwaza Wanda
 Kingdom Hearts Trading Card Game
 Lamaze
 Licca
 Metal Fight Beyblade – fighting game
 Metal Fight Beyblade Zero-G – fighting game
 Omnibot – line of toy robots
 Plarail – plastic electric train set system (called "Tomica World" outside Japan)
 Pop-up Pirate
 Pretty Rhythm
 PriPara - the successor to the Pretty Rhythm series
 Q-steer – micro radio-controlled cars based on Choro-Q
 Rummikub
 Screwball Scramble
 Shinkansen Henkei Robo Shinkalion
 Starriors
 Switch 16
 Thomas and Friends – Plarail, Capsule Plarail, Tomica, and Tomix themes, and preschool products
 Thunderbirds
 Tomica – die-cast toy
 Tomica Hyper Rescue Drive Head Kidō Kyūkyū Keisatsu
 Tomica Kizuna Gattai Earth Granner
 Tomix – the model railway brand of Tomytec, a subsidiary of Takara Tomy
 Tomy Tutor – home computer
 Tomytronic – 3D handheld game series
 Transformers
 Tron – action figures and vehicles based on the Disney film
 Teletubbies
 Wedding Peach
 Mermaid Melody Pichi Pichi Pitch
 My Hero Academia
 Cardcaptor Sakura
 Cardcaptor Sakura: Clear Card
 Slayers
 Revolutionary Girl Utena
Z-Knights – line of constructible models of humanoid robots styled after knights that ran from 1991 to 1993.
 Zoids
 Zootopia
 Water Games

References

External links
  (Tomy International)
  (Takara Tomy) 

 
Manufacturing companies based in Tokyo
Software companies based in Tokyo
Game manufacturers
Video game companies of Japan
Toy train manufacturers
Robotics companies of Japan
Toy companies of Japan
Katsushika
Japanese companies established in 2006
Toy brands
Toy companies established in 2006
Radio-controlled car manufacturers
Trading card companies
Japanese brands
Companies listed on the Tokyo Stock Exchange